Anzhou is a town in Anxin County, Hebei, China. It is not far from Lake Baiyangdian. Now it belongs to Xiong'an New Area.

.

Township-level divisions of Hebei
Anxin County